Benton Lake Wetland Management District is located in the U.S. state of Montana and is the largest wetland district in the nation. Covering an area of  around Benton Lake, the district extends from the Canada–United States border to Helena, Montana. Within the district are 23 Waterfowl Production Areas under conservation easements with local landowners ensuring these areas will not be developed, yet will remain within private ownership. The district is managed by the U.S. Fish and Wildlife Service with headquarters located at Benton Lake National Wildlife Refuge.

References

External links
 Benton Lake Wetland Management District

National Wildlife Refuges in Montana